Avanti House Secondary School is coeducational secondary school and sixth form located in the Stanmore area of the London Borough of Harrow, England.

It is a Hindu faith free school that was established in 2012, and is part of the Avanti Schools Trust.

Avanti House Secondary School offers GCSEs as programmes of study for pupils, while students in the sixth form have the option to study from a range of A Levels. The school also offers courses studying Sanskrit.

References

External links
Avanti House Secondary School official website

Secondary schools in the London Borough of Harrow
Educational institutions established in 2012
2012 establishments in England
Free schools in London
Hindu schools in the United Kingdom
Schools affiliated with the International Society for Krishna Consciousness
Free Schools in England with a Formal Faith Designation